Fordington is a part of the town of Dorchester, Dorset; originally a separate village, it has now become a suburb. Taking its name from a ford across the River Frome, it grew up around the church of St. George (where Henry Moule was once Vicar), though the parish was much larger and surrounded Dorchester on three sides. It was part of the liberty of Fordington.

The will of Alfred the Great is said to make an early reference to Saint George of England, in the context of the church of Fordington, Dorset. Certainly at Fordington a stone over the south door records the miraculous appearance of St George to lead crusaders into battle.

At West Fordington is St Mary's Church, built in 1911–12 to the designs of Charles Ponting. It replaced Christ Church as parish church in 1929.

References

External links

Geography of Dorchester, Dorset